was laid down on 24 April 1944 at Morris Heights, N.Y., by the Consolidated Shipbuilding Corp.; reclassified YTB-367 on 15 May 1944; launched on 10 June 1944; and completed and placed in service on 27 October 1944.

Wawasee—reclassified as YTM-367 in February 1962—operated at Boston, Massachusetts, performing tug and tow services in the waters of the 1st Naval District for her entire career. She was taken out of service and struck from the Navy list in May 1974.

References
 
 NavSource Online: Service Ship Photo Archive Wawasee (YTM-367)

Sassaba-class tugs
Ships built in Morris Heights, Bronx
1944 ships
World War II auxiliary ships of the United States